Daniel Peter Quinn (born June 1, 1965) is a Canadian former professional ice hockey player and former professional golfer. Quinn played 14 seasons in the National Hockey League (NHL). Quinn was born in Ottawa, Ontario, but grew up in Brockville, Ontario.

Calgary Flames
Quinn was drafted 13th overall by the Calgary Flames in the 1983 NHL Entry Draft, while he was playing for the Belleville Bulls of the Ontario Hockey League (OHL). Quinn made his debut with Calgary halfway through the next season, scoring 52 points in 54 games. When he was called up he had been leading the OHL in scoring with 59 points. During his third season with the Flames, he scored 30-goals and 72-points and then added 15 more points in 18 playoff games as he advanced to the Stanley Cup Final where his Flames were defeated by the Montreal Canadiens. The next season, on November 12, 1986, Quinn was traded to the Pittsburgh Penguins for Mike Bullard.

Pittsburgh Penguins

In Pittsburgh, Quinn had the most success, scoring a career high 40 goals in 1987–88, and a career-high 94 points the next season. He was unable to duplicate the success the next year and after struggling with just 29 points in the first 41 games of the 1989-90 season he was on the move again.

Vancouver Canucks

Quinn was traded to the Vancouver Canucks in 1990 in a six-player swap and he scored at nearly a point-a-game clip after the deal. The following year his production slipped and by the trade deadline he was on the move again as the Canucks shipped him to St. Louis in a seven-player blockbuster trade.

St. Louis Blues

Quinn finished the year putting up 11-points in 14-games then added 11 more in 13 playoff games for the Blues but it wasn't enough to secure him a spot in the lineup. After the season, the Blues lost veteran defenseman Harold Snespts to retirement and then lost their captain and top blue liner Scott Stevens as compensation for a free agent signing leaving a big hole on their defence. In an effort to fix this Quinn was packaged up with young forward Rod Brind'Amour and dealt to the Philadelphia Flyers in exchange for tough defenseman Murray Baron and centre Ron Sutter.

Philadelphia Flyers

While Brind'Amour was an immediate success in Philadelphia, leading the team in scoring, Quinn struggled to find the net and managed just 37 points in 67 games. This marked the worst production of his career and spelled the end for his time with the Flyers. Quinn failed to find a new club over the summer before finally signing a deal on the eve of the 1992-93 season with the Minnesota North Stars.

Minnesota North Stars

Quinn got off to a slow start with the North Stars with no-goals and just four assists in his first eleven games before his season - and is career - got derailed. Quinn was alleged to have raped a 19-year-old woman in a hotel room in Minnesota after a game with the Pittsburgh Penguins. Quinn maintained that he and the woman had sex, but that it was consensual. The police did not press charges, but the team released him from his contract saying that he violated the team curfew on the night of the incident.

Unable to find an NHL team willing to take a chance on him, Quinn signed in Switzerland for the 1993-94 and finished just two points shy of leading the team in scoring despite playing eleven less games then the team leader. This production was enough to attract NHL attention once again.

Ottawa Senators

On March 15, 1994, with the season winding down, Quinn's hometown Ottawa Senators inked him to a free agent deal and he paid immediate dividends scoring 7 goals in 13-games with the club to finish the season.

Los Angeles Kings

Quinn signed a free agent deal with the Los Angeles Kings though an NHL lockout that delayed the start of the year allowed him to return to Switzerland for seven games before the NHL started up. With the Kings Quinn scored 31-points in 44-games good for third on the team in scoring.

After the year, he was a free agent once again and once again inked a deal with his hometown club.

Ottawa Senators Second Stint

Quinn once again was productive with the Senators producing at close to a point-a-game for Ottawa. The Senators usual first line centre Alexei Yashin was holding out for a new contract pushing Quinn into a primary role where he delivered for the club. Quinn set a then-team record with a six-point game versus the Tampa Bay Lightning but despite all this, the Senators traded him to Philadelphia after just 28 games where he produced 24-points.

Philadelphia Flyers Second Stint

Quinn's production dipped in Philadelphia with 22 points in 35 games despite the fact he was slotted in, briefly, on the Flyers top line with John LeClair and Eric Lindros. Quinn left the Flyers after the season as a free agent.

Pittsburgh Penguins Second Stint

Quinn signed a one-year deal to return to the scene of his high scoring seasons in Pittsburgh but he was unable to replicate his success.  After 16-games where Quinn posted no goals and just three assists the Penguins released him and he announced his retirement from hockey in November of 1996.

Golf
Quinn embarked on a career in golf after his NHL career, and was one of the top players on the Celebrity Tour. In 2000, he caddied for John Daly at the U.S. Open. Quinn also caddies part-time for Ernie Els.

At the end of April 2014, Quinn became caddie for golfer Joost Luiten from the Netherlands, ranked number 43 at the Official World Golf Ranking.

Quinn has competed at the American Century Celebrity Golf Classic, an annual competition to determine the best golfers among American sports and entertainment celebrities. He won the tournament in 1992, 2001, 2002, 2004 and 2012, and has a total of eighteen top-10 finishes. The tournament, televised by NBC in July, is played at Edgewood Tahoe Golf Course in Lake Tahoe, Nevada.

Quinn has also played in four Web.com Tour events, but never made the 36-hole cut.

Personal 
Quinn currently resides in Florida with his wife and their two daughters and a son.

Career statistics

Regular season and playoffs

International

References

External links
 
Hockey Draft Central

1965 births
Living people
Belleville Bulls players
Caddies
Calgary Flames draft picks
Calgary Flames players
Canadian expatriate ice hockey players in Switzerland
Canadian ice hockey centres
Canadian people of Irish descent
Detroit Vipers players
EV Zug players
Ice hockey people from Ottawa
Los Angeles Kings players
Minnesota North Stars players
National Hockey League first-round draft picks
Ottawa Senators players
Philadelphia Flyers players
Pittsburgh Penguins players
SC Bern players
Sportspeople from Brockville
St. Louis Blues players
Vancouver Canucks captains
Vancouver Canucks players
Golfing people from Ontario
Canadian expatriate ice hockey players in the United States